American Family Fields of Phoenix, formerly known as Maryvale Baseball Park and briefly as Brewers Fields of Phoenix, is a baseball park located in the Maryvale community of Phoenix, Arizona.

The facility is owned and operated by the city's Parks and Recreation department, and holds 10,000 people. It is the spring training home of the Milwaukee Brewers and their minor league affiliates (replacing Compadre Stadium in southeast suburban Chandler). It is also the home stadium to both of the Arizona Complex League Brewers Minor League Baseball teams of the Arizona Complex League. American Family Insurance has naming rights for the Fields. In addition to the main stadium, the facility includes 5 full practice fields, 2 practice infields, a 2-story clubhouse building, and a 2,000-space parking facility.

In February 2018, the Brewers announced plans for a major renovation of the facility.  The renovation will include a new clubhouse building, renovation of the existing Brewers clubhouse, a newly constructed agility field, a new major league practice field, new batting tunnels, covered practice mounds, a new entry plaza, and new & refurbished parking lots.  Costs will be shared by the Brewers ($56-60 million), the city of Phoenix ($2 million/year over 5 years), and the Arizona Sports and Tourism Authority (approximately $5.7 million).  Completion is expected by the 2019 spring training season.

References

External links
 Official Site
 Milwaukee Brewers spring training information

Cactus League venues
Sports venues in Phoenix, Arizona
Milwaukee Brewers spring training venues
Baseball venues in Arizona
1998 establishments in Arizona
Sports venues completed in 1998
Arizona Complex League ballparks
Sports complexes in the United States